The Gloucester 18 (Whitecap) is an American trailerable sailboat that was designed by Harry R. Sindle as a day sailer and first built about 1974.

Production
The design was built between about 1974 and 1984 by Lockley Newport Boats in the United States as the Whitecap or Whitecap 18, and later, when the company name was changed to Gloucester Yachts, the boat was renamed the Gloucester 18. The boat is often confused with the 1985 Gloucester 18, itself a re-badging of the Buccaneer 18. The older design is now referred to as the Gloucester 18 (Whitecap).

Design
The Gloucester 18 (Whitecap) is a recreational sailboat, built predominantly of fiberglass, with wood trim. It has a fractional sloop rig, a spooned raked stem, a plumb transom, a transom-hung rudder controlled by a tiller and a retractable centerboard. It displaces  and carries  of ballast.

See also
List of sailing boat types

References

1970s sailboat type designs
Sailing yachts
Trailer sailers
Sailboat type designs by Harry R. Sindle
Sailboat types built by Lockley Newport Boats
Sailboat types built by Gloucester Yachts